Veera Thirumagan is a 1962 Indian Tamil-language historical action film, produced by AVM Productions and directed by A. C. Tirulokchandar. This was the directorial debut for Tirulokchandar. The film stars C. L. Anandan, Sachu, E. V. Saroja and S. A. Ashokan. It was released on 3 May 1962 and emerged a moderate success.

Plot

Cast 
 C. L. Anandan
 Sachu
 E. V. Saroja
 S. A. Ashokan

Production 
A. C. Tirulokchandar earlier wrote the screenplay for the hit film, Vijayapuri Veeran, an adaptation of The Three Musketeers. He was introduced by actor S. A. Ashokan to M. Saravanan of AVM Productions, and became very close to the AVM clan, he made his directorial debut with Veera Thirumagan. Former child artist Sachu made her debut as lead actress with this film. While AVM was generally known for producing drama films with contemporary settings, Veera Thirumagan differed from them by being an "action oriented costume drama". According to Saravanan, it was the first film using zoom lens.

Soundtrack 
The music was composed by Viswanathan–Ramamoorthy and lyrics were written by Kannadasan. The songs "Roja Magale Rajakumari" and "Paadatha Paattellam" were well received. The latter song was remixed for Rudhran (2023).

Marketing 
To promote the film, S. S. Balan of the magazine Ananda Vikatan suggested the makers to promote the film in the magazine as a four-half page advertisement to which they agreed. Similarly, they published six advertisements and four-page advertisements in the form of check at the same time in the magazine Kumudam. It became the first Tamil film whose banner was put up in Mount Road, Madras using neon sign.

Release and reception 
Veera Thirumagan was released on 3 May 1962. Kanthan of Kalki said Ashokan was the only actor who performed well, and criticised the film's other aspects, including the cinematography, art direction and music. According to Saravanan, the film was a moderate success.

References

External links 
 

1960s Tamil-language films
1962 directorial debut films
1962 films
AVM Productions films
Films directed by A. C. Tirulokchandar
Films scored by Viswanathan–Ramamoorthy